A Girl from Lübeck is a 1962 novel by Scottish writer Bruce Marshall. It is a lighthearted satiric parable with themes of romance, suspense, and intrigue. As the mystery surrounding the girl from Lübeck unfolds, the meaning of Faith and Grace is revealed.

Plot summary 
Versory is a literary lecturer engaged in spreading English culture ("from Beowulf to Dylan Thomas") throughout Germany. He needs a ride after delivering a talk to a group of matrons. Versory is surprised that his driver is a young woman, Hannelore. He sees her as a blonde beauty with a charming personality, and becomes infatuated with her. They arrange to meet again in Paris, to attend a meeting of literary lecturers from other countries.

Once in Paris, Versory becomes suspicious to how Hannelore can afford her expensive clothes and habits. After their meeting, Hannelore states that there is no way to contact her and that she will get in touch with him. She contacts him regularly and indicates her affection for him. Versory continues to be suspicious of Hannelore and wonders what she is hiding. Versory himself is not what he appears to be. His career as a lecturer serves as a cover for other activities. Versory has a connection with a gentleman from South America. Hannelore is found in the establishment of Mme.Putiphar. Vesory's chief takes Hannelore in his sports car and drives off somewhere. There is ambiguity to whether Hennelore loves Versory or whether she is using him. The ending reveals the truth surrounding Hannelore.

References

Novels by Bruce Marshall
1962 British novels
William Collins, Sons books
Lübeck